The Main Line of Public Works was a package of legislation passed by the Commonwealth of Pennsylvania in 1826 to establish a means of transporting freight between Philadelphia and Pittsburgh. It funded the construction of various long-proposed canal and road projects, mostly in southern Pennsylvania, that became a canal system and later added railroads. Built between 1826 and 1834, it established the Pennsylvania Canal System and the Allegheny Portage Railroad.
 
Later amendments substituted a new technology, railroads, in place of the planned but costly  canal connecting the Delaware River in Philadelphia to the Susquehanna River.

Historic background

Trans-Appalachian settlement had begun in earnest during the latter years of the French and Indian War (1754-1763). Following the war, the British government made several agreements, primarily with the Iroquois Confederacy, which resulted in official policies to curb the expansion of settlement in the colonial Mid-West. This was one of many British policies that created support for the American Revolution—not just along the American frontier for those hoping to emigrate into the Ohio Country, but also for Eastern seaboard populations that were blooming in the pre-industrialization period. 
 
After the 1779 Sullivan Expedition broke the power of the Five Nations of the Iroquois towards the end of the American Revolution, settlement became viable from the lower Susquehanna Valley to upstate New York as far as Lake Erie. The United States was able to claim trans-Appalachian territories from the Ohio River to the lower Great Lakes, and west to Minnesota and Wisconsin. 
 
As the American Revolutionary War wound down in the 1780s, many family groups moved west, establishing scattered settlements from below the Wyoming Valley across the near west into the retreating western frontiers and the lands of the old Ohio Country. 
 
In the early 1800s, the new farms along the moving frontier were connected back to Atlantic seaboard cities by turnpikes, canals, and other transportation infrastructure works funded mostly by private funds or local governments.
 
The War of 1812 exacerbated a difficult energy crisis, and bituminous coal imports from Liverpool, England, ground to a halt under an 1812 embargo. Industrialists in Philadelphia pressed for some solution to their foundries' fuel needs and by year's end, legislation was on the books for improving the Schuylkill River into the Schuylkill Canal. But this project was underfunded, and other canals were completed first, including  the Lehigh Canal in late 1820 and the Erie Canal in 1821.

By the 1810s, population west of the mountains was exploding. Regional transport hubs were established in Brownsville, Pittsburgh, Cincinnati, Buffalo, Detroit, New Orleans, and in the 1840s, St. Louis, Chicago, and St. Joseph, Missouri. The markets of this burgeoning population were targeted by the business class of Philadelphia and New Jersey.
 

In 1823, White proposed creating a navigational canal that would allow deep keeled coastal ships to reach docks and pickup and transship coal down the Lehigh Canal to Easton, Pennsylvania. The first 60 miles went down to the Philadelphia suburb town of Bristol and later became the Delaware Canal. An employee of industrialist Josiah White's had figured out how to get "Rock Coal" to burn properly during the War of 1812 renewing serious interest in exploiting these relatively coal resources. Efforts to improve shipping capabilities on the Schuylkill Navigation was lagging hope when backers took to quarreling over the best way to proceed; disgusted, White distanced himself from the project. White went looking for a source of coal in 1815 looked at the mines of the failing and unreliable Lehigh Coal Mine Company—who'd almost managed to drop more coal in the Lehigh than they'd delivered to market since their founding in 1792. After surveying and deciding improving Navigation on the Lehigh could be feasible, returned to lease the operations of that company.
 
A couple years later, the legislature declined another offer by the Lehigh Coal and Navigation Company (LC&N) which had built the Lehigh Canal with private funds. LC&N was unquestionably one of the most innovative companies of the era, driving the mining, transportation and industrial development of Pennsylvania by example, implementation, and by funding quite a few projects, as well. This new proposal was to build—at the companies expense— the project that would (in concept) become their version of the eventual Delaware Canal (alternatively the 'Delaware Division of the Pennsylvania Canal') built by the states engineering managers a few years later. The route was nearly the same, but the Delaware Canal as the state built it had numerous engineering flaws, including locks both too short and unpaired (single & supporting only one way traffic) locks LC&N's experience and expertise would have mitigated. LC&N had started coal flowing to Philadelphia using short squared-off blocky barges it called coal arks, but in 1822-23 was already re-doing the upper four locks on the Lehigh Canal to support a steam powered tug pulling boats over  built to support two way traffic with full locks. By 1825 the volume of coal coming down the Lehigh & Delaware to Philadelphia was becoming huge and problematic — LC&N was rapidly over logging the forests feeding the Lehigh to build boats for the one way trip. The extra expenses of the lack of a tow path canal for the sixty miles Easton-Philadelphia was very costly to LC&N, and the state's Delaware Canal attempt when opened in 1832 was five years later than promised and didn't work; the State had to hire Josiah White to repair its major deficiencies, then needed LC&N's expertise to operate it. LC&N ended up running both canals into the 1930s, and retained the rights to the Lehigh until the 1960s. While some problems were fixable, the Delaware Canal's lock's design was always an costly economic problem until the Canal became the parkland and current haven for pleasure boats.
 
White and Hazard made the offer in return for a break on tolls, and even included an offer to operate the system at cost—the state garnering all the tolls. This offer too was declined, and in 1827 in a separate amending act, the state authorized the Delaware Canal, which was delayed for a few more years costing LC&N many dollars, until it was finally dug alongside, and generally in sight of the Delaware River between Easton down river to Bristol. When completed in 1832 by the state it also didn't work—having leaking issues and water supply problems like those that plagued the Union Canal and Schuylkill Navigation, and the state needed to hire Josiah White to fix it before it became fully usable in 1834. Lehigh Coal & Navigation Company would operate the Canal into the 1930s, and controlled its resources and those rights attained on the Lehigh until the 1960s when they reverted or conveyed back to the state.

Hence the Canal system was envisioned and built at the urging of New Jersey and Pennsylvanian businessmen, especially Philadelphia's bearing witness to the navigations improving commerce on the Lehigh and Schuylkill Rivers, though in 1824 both systems needed further development. But the same decision makers were also continually reading the copious press coverage about the progress, the works designs, and engineering feats accomplished or building as the Erie Canal progressed. Philadelphia's luminaries were vying with other coastal cities to become the United States' most important and influential port as the country's population expanded westward to the Ohio Country and Northwest Territory regions.  The system would also not only open better access to the newly opened Southeastern Coal Region and the initial mines in the Panther Creek Valley but authorized an extension of the Lehigh Canal up to White Haven, and a railroad connecting that upper canal with the coal sources in the Wyoming Valley. All the eastern projects were to reliably  provide clean-burning anthracite coal to eastern cities that had already consumed much of the eastern forests for heating fuel.

List of works
The rail portions of the system were authorized in 1828 by an act of the Pennsylvania General Assembly entitled An act relative to the Pennsylvania Canal, and to provide for the commencement of a Railroad to be constructed at the expense of the state and to be styled "The Pennsylvania Railroad" (Act of March 24, 1828, Pamph. Laws, p. 221).

Begun with Navigations construction along the Susquehanna and the West Fork of the Susquehanna with surveys for the best route over the barrier of the northern Allegheny Mountains, the system in time ran from Philadelphia on the Delaware estuary westwards across the great plain of southern Pennsylvania (goal of connecting the Susquehanna to New York City via canals) through Harrisburg and across the state to Pittsburgh and connected with other divisions of the Pennsylvania Canal.  It consisted of the following principal sections, moving from east to west:

Philadelphia and Columbia Railroad:  from Philadelphia to Columbia near the former ferry site known as Wright's Ferry, in Lancaster County. Originally expected to be a bona fide canal in the 1820s conception, the easternmost leg of the Pennsylvania Canal was to be a continuation of the first funded and more difficult to construct engineering navigations and construction farther west in less populated rural regions. The canal joining the Delaware and Susquehanna rivers was to run across the most populated expanse of Pennsylvania's Great Valley region (and so was delayed politically in part) but its planning was overtaken by the growth of railroad technology, which by the mid-1830s had demonstrated sufficient promise to adopt the new technology for the leg of the capability and funding and construction was shifted to a railroad—it was faster and cheaper to build above ground and make bridges than it was to dig a deep ditch and provide it with reliable water supplies to enable two way barge traffic. 
Eastern Division Canal:  from Columbia to Duncan's Island at the mouth of the Juniata River.
Juniata Division Canal:  from Duncan's Island to Hollidaysburg
Allegheny Portage Railroad:  from Hollidaysburg to Johnstown
Western Division Canal:  from Johnstown to the terminus in Pittsburgh.

The canals reduced travel time between Philadelphia and Pittsburgh from at least 23 days to just four.

The Main Line of Public Works was completed in 1834 and was sold to the Pennsylvania Railroad on June 25, 1857, for $7,500,000. Within a year, the PRR replaced the Philadelphia-Pittsburgh route with an entirely rail-based system.

Philadelphia and Columbia Railroad

The Philadelphia and Columbia Railroad began in Philadelphia at Broad and Vine Streets, ran north on Broad and west on Pennsylvania Avenue (a segment later taken over and submerged/tunneled over by the Reading Railroad), then headed northwest across the Columbia Bridge over the Schuylkill River. Just after crossing the river, it traveled up the Belmont Plane, an inclined plane in the current location of West Fairmount Park, and continued west across the eastern part of the state to Columbia, where the Columbia Plane headed down to the Susquehanna River. At that point, the eastern division of the canal continued north along the river and then west.

The Northern Liberties and Penn Township Railroad was incorporated in 1829 to build a branch continuing east on Noble Street and Willow Street to the Delaware River. This opened in 1834.

Belmont Plane

Steam-driven cables dragged the railway cars to the top of Belmont Hill.

The Plane was the site of a signal event in railroad history. On July 10, 1836, the Philadelphia-based Norris Locomotive Works drove a 4-2-0 locomotive up the Incline, making it the first steam locomotive to climb an ascending grade while pulling a load. So remarkable was this accomplishment that reports in engineering journals doubted its occurrence. Nine days later, the engine repeated the feat in a more formal trial with an even greater load.

In 1850, the state bought the West Philadelphia Railroad, which had been incorporated in 1835 to bypass the Belmont Plane and failed after completing only the section from 52nd Street west to the main line at Rosemont. The state built the rest from 52nd Street east to downtown, but on a different alignment than the one originally planned; the new line, put into operation October 15, 1850, ended at the west end of the Market Street Bridge, from which the City Railroad continued east. The old line, which ran from the Schuylkill River up the Belmont Plane to Ardmore along the route of present-day Montgomery Avenue in Lower Merion Township, was abandoned.

The Columbia Bridge and line east to Broad and Vine Streets were sold to the Philadelphia and Reading Railroad as part of its main line. The Reading acquired the Northern Liberties and Penn Township Railroad in 1870, giving it access to the Delaware River.

The section of the old Pennsylvania Railroad running from Philadelphia west through Chester County and, by extension, the western suburbs of Philadelphia, is still known as the Main Line.

The Columbia Plane, which lowered railway cars down to the Eastern Division Canal along the Susquehanna River, was bypassed in 1840 by a new track alignment.

Eastern Division Canal
The Pennsylvania Canal's Eastern Division, which opened in 1833, ran  along the east side of the Susquehanna River between Columbia and Duncan's Island at the mouth of the Juniata River. The state originally planned a canal of  running between the Union Canal at Middletown to the Juniata. However, the plan changed in 1828, when the state opted to extend the Eastern Division  further south to connect with the newly decided replacement of a canal by the Philadelphia and Columbia Railroad at historic Wright's Ferry.

Engineers faced complications at the northern end of the Eastern Division Canal, where it met the Juniata Division Canal and the Susquehanna Division Canal at Duncan's Island. Boats had to cross from one side of the Susquehanna River to the other between either the Susquehanna Division or the Juniata Division on the west side and the Eastern Division on the east side. This formed a pool across which boats could be pulled from a wooden, two-tier towpath bridge at Clark's Ferry. Two Duncan's Island lift locks raised or lowered the boats traveling between the dam pool and the other canals.

Juniata Division Canal

Subsequently, the state agreed to extend the canal to Hollidaysburg and the eastern end of the Allegheny Portage Railroad,  from the Susquehanna.

At North's Island,  from the Susquehanna, they were towed by a water powered continuous rope to the north side of the river across a slack water pool formed by a dam. From North's Island to Huntingdon, the river was dammed in three more places to feed water to the canal, and above Huntingdon, 14 more dams were needed to create  of slack water navigation in the river to supplement  of travel in segments of canal. In addition, the state built three reservoirs on Juniata tributaries to keep the upper parts of the canal filled with water.

Remnants
At the western end of the canal, the Hollidaysburg Canal Basin Park has preserved two canal basins and a connecting lock; a museum at the park illustrates how canal boats transferred between the canal and the Allegheny Portage Railroad.

The Pennsylvania Main Line Canal, Juniata Division, Canal Section was added to the National Register of Historic Places in 2002.

Allegheny Portage Railroad
 From 1834 until 1854, when the Pennsylvania Railroad Company finished a competing line, the Allegheny Portage Railroad made continuous boat traffic possible over the Allegheny Mountains between the Juniata and Western Division Canals. Infrastructure included 153 drains and culverts.

Western Division Canal

In 1826, the state legislature authorized the first segment of the Western Division Canal, from Pittsburgh up the Allegheny River to its confluence with the Kiskiminetas River at Freeport. Pittsburgh residents favored a route that would follow the south bank of the Allegheny River and terminate in Pittsburgh, while residents of the borough of Allegheny favored a north bank canal ending in the borough, across the river from Pittsburgh. Eventually, the canal was run along the physically more favorable north bank, but the state agreed to build the main terminal and turning basin in Pittsburgh and a secondary terminal and connecting canal, the Allegheny Outlet, in the borough. Linking to the Ohio River at Pittsburgh, the Western Division Canal also linked, through a tunnel of  under Grant's Hill in Pittsburgh, with the Monongahela River.

Subsequent Western Division Canal extensions went from Freeport up the Kiskiminetas and Conemaugh Rivers to Blairsville and then to the western end of the Allegheny Portage Railroad at Johnstown. East of Tunnelton, the route went through a canal tunnel of  built to avoid a long loop of the Conemaugh River. The first fully loaded freight boat traveled from Johnstown to Pittsburgh in 1831; the route through Grant's Hill opened in 1832. From Freeport, a separate extension, the Kittanning Feeder, ran  up the Allegheny River to Kittanning.

Johnstown Flood
The 1889 Johnstown Flood was caused by the failure of the South Fork Dam, part of the Main Line of Public Works.  The dam across the Little Conemaugh River in the hills above Johnstown, Pennsylvania, created a two-square-mile (5.2 km2) reservoir. Dubbed Lake Conemaugh, it supplied water to the Western Division Canal. When canal traffic declined, the lake and dam were abandoned, then sold to the Pennsylvania Railroad in 1857; the railroad in turn sold them to private interests. They were purchased by the South Fork Fishing and Hunting Club in 1879, and a private resort was built surrounding the lake.  On May 31, 1889, following heavy rains, the South Fork Dam failed, sending 20 million tons (18.2 million cubic meters) of water down the gorge toward Johnstown. More than 2,200 people were killed.

Remnants
Saltsburg Canal Park, where Loyalhanna Creek joins the Conemaugh River to form the Kiskiminetas River, recognizes the canal's economic contribution to Saltsburg.

Points of interest

See also

 Allegheny Portage Railroad
 Delaware and Hudson Canal
 Delaware Canal, aka later: Pennsylvania Canal (Delaware Division)
 List of canals in the United States
 Lehigh Canal
 Pennsylvania Canal System
 Pennsylvania Canal, aka later: Pennsylvania Canal (Eastern Division) 
 Pennsylvania Canal (North Branch Division)
 Pennsylvania Canal (Susquehanna Division)
 Pennsylvania Canal (West Branch Division)
IPennsylvania Canal Guard Lock and Feeder Dam, Raystown Branch
 Pennsylvania Canal Tunnel
 Pennsylvania Canal and Limestone Run Aqueduct
 Schuylkill Canal

Notes

References

Further reading
For more on the Philadelphia and Columbia Railroad, see William Hasell Wilson, The Columbia-Philadelphia Railroad and Its Successor (1896). A reprint of this booklet was issued in 1985. See also John C. Trautwine, Jr., The Philadelphia and Columbia Railroad of 1834, in Philadelphia History, Vol. 2, No. 7 (Philadelphia, PA: City History Soc. of Philadelphia, 1925). This is a pamphlet written for The City History Society of Philadelphia and read at the meeting of March 15, 1921.

External links

Pennsylvania Canal Society
American Canal Society
National Canal Museum

Canals in Pennsylvania
Defunct Pennsylvania railroads
Predecessors of the Pennsylvania Railroad
Railway companies established in 1828
Railway companies disestablished in 1857
1828 establishments in Pennsylvania
1857 disestablishments in Pennsylvania
Canals on the National Register of Historic Places in Pennsylvania
National Register of Historic Places in Mifflin County, Pennsylvania
National Register of Historic Places in Westmoreland County, Pennsylvania
American companies established in 1828